This is a list of physiologists who have Wikipedia articles, in alphabetical order by surname.

A

 Richard W. Aldrich
 Edgar Allen
 Adelbert Ames, Jr.
 Clay Armstrong
 Eugene Aserinsky
 Edwin B. Astwood
 John Auer

B

 Anna Baetjer
 Frederick Banting
 Diane Barber
 George Bartholomew
 Hans Baruch
 William Beaumont
 Harry Beevers
 Charles Bell
 Claude Bernard
 Charles Best
 George Billman
 Ethel Ronzoni Bishop
 Harold F. Blum
 Walter Boron
 Henry Pickering Bowditch
 Chandler McCuskey Brooks

C

 Walter Bradford Cannon
 Anton Julius Carlson
 William Bosworth Castle
 Gerty Cori
 André Frédéric Cournand
 Patricia S. Cowings

D

 John Call Dalton
 Hallowell Davis
 George Delahunty
 David Bruce Dill
 Hal Downey

E

 Joseph Erlanger

F

 Wallace O. Fenn
 Donald S. Fredrickson

G

 William Francis Ganong, Jr.
 Theodore Garland, Jr.
 Herbert Spencer Gasser
 Quentin Gibson
 David R. Goddard
 Carl W. Gottschalk
 Charles Claude Guthrie
 Arthur Guyton

H

 Mary Hagedorn
 Janet E. Hall
 Selig Hecht
 Frances A. Hellebrandt
 Craig Heller
 Yandell Henderson
 Peter Hochachka
 Alan Hofmann
 Lancelot Hogben
 Raymond B. Huey
 Charles Brenton Huggins
 Ida Henrietta Hyde

J

 Edmund Jacobson
 E. Morton Jellinek
 David Julius

K

 Eugene Kennedy
 Helen Dean King
 Tom Kirkwood
 Nathaniel Kleitman
 Brian Kobilka
 August Krogh
 Stephen Kuffler

L

 Reuben Lasker
 Jacques Loeb
 Clifford Ladd Prosser

M

 John James Rickard Macleod
 Paul D. MacLean
 Fran%C3%A7ois Magendie
 Jesse Francis McClendon
 Donal T. Manahan
 Peter Medawar
 Glenn Allan Millikan
 Johannes Peter Müller

N

 David Nalin
 Elizabeta Nemeth
 Nicholas Nevid
 Tim Noakes

P

 Irvine Page
 John Pappenheimer
 Nicolae Paulescu

R

 Hermann Rahn
 Marcus Raichle
 James B. Ranck, Jr.
 Roberto Refinetti
 Ernest W. Retzlaff
 Justin Rhodes
 Michael A. Rice
 Edith A. Roberts
 Robert Root-Bernstein

S

 Kiki Sanford
 Laura Schlessinger
 Bodil Schmidt-Nielsen
 Knut Schmidt-Nielsen
 Theodor Schwann
 Dale Schoeller
 Édouard Séguin
 Sean Senechal
 Homer Smith
 John Speakman
 Gordon Stein
 Arthur H Steinhaus
 Grover C. Stephens
 Hubertus Strughold
 Paul K. Stumpf
 Earl Wilbur Sutherland, Jr.

T

 Anitra Thorhaug
 Caroline tum Suden
 Luca Turin
 Abby Howe Turner
 J. Scott Turner

W

 Torkel Weis-Fogh

Medical lists
Physiologists